Selska Gora is a small dispersed settlement in the Municipality of Mirna in southeastern Slovenia. It lies in the hills west of Mirna in the traditional region of Lower Carniola. The municipality is now included in the Southeast Slovenia Statistical Region.

References

External links
Selska Gora on Geopedia

Populated places in the Municipality of Mirna